Calvo is a Spanish or Italian surname, meaning bald, which was first used during the Middle Ages. It may refer to:

Cinema
A.D. Calvo, Argentine film producer
José Calvo, Spanish film actor
Pablito Calvo, Spanish child actor

Literature
Agustín García Calvo, Spanish writer
Bonifaci Calvo, Genoese troubadour
Cesar Calvo, Peruvian writer
César Calvo de Araujo, Peruvian writer and painter
Emanuel Calvo, Italian poet and physician
Javier Calvo, Spanish writer
Pedro Calvo Asensio, Spanish playwright
Sabrina Calvo (born David), French writer

Politics
Bartolomé Calvo, Colombian politician
Carmen Calvo Poyato, Spanish politician
Horace L. Calvo, American politician and jurist
Joaquín Bernardo Calvo Rosales, Costa Rican politician
José Calvo Sotelo, Spanish politician
Kristof Calvo, Belgian politician
Leopoldo Calvo Sotelo, Spanish politician
Mariano Enrique Calvo Cuellar, Bolivian politician
Martín Calvo Encalada, Chilean politician
 Pilar Calvo (born 1963), Catalan politician

Sports
Alex Calvo García, Spanish football player
Carlos Calvo Sobrado, Spanish football player
Daniel Calvo Panizo, Spanish football player
Diego Calvo, Costa Rican footballer
Dionisio Calvo, Filipino basketball player
Francisco Calvo, Costa Rican football player
Gabriel Calvo (1955–2021), Spanish gymnast 
Jack Calvo, Cuban baseball player
Javier Arley Reina Calvo, Colombian football player
José Antonio García Calvo, Spanish football player
José María Calvo, Argentine football player
Juan Carlos Calvo, Uruguayan football player
Luis Darío Calvo, Argentine football player
Michael Calvo, Cuban triple jumper
Miguel Palencia Calvo, Spanish football player
Ricardo Calvo, Spanish chess player
Toni Calvo, Spanish football player

Others
Adriana Calvo (1947–2010), Argentine physicist and activist
Adrianne Calvo, American chef
Carlos Calvo (historian), Argentine historian
Carmen Calvo (artist) (born 1950), Spanish conceptual artist
Daniel Calvo (judge), Chilean judge
Edmond-François Calvo, French comics artist
Fortuna Calvo-Roth, American journalist
Guillermo Calvo, Argentine-American economist
Maria Rosa Calvo-Manzano, Spanish harp professor
Pedro Calvo, Cuban singer
Rafael Calvo Serer, Spanish professor
Randolph Roque Calvo, American Roman Catholic bishop

Italian-language surnames
Spanish-language surnames